Bliss Ackuaku is a Ghanaian politician and member of the first parliament of the second republic of Ghana representing Dzodze Constituency under the membership of the National Alliance of Liberals (NAL).

Education and early life 
He was born 18 April 1918 in Volta Region of Ghana. He attended Achimota College. He also obtained his Bachelor of Laws degree from The University of London and he also attended King's College.

Politics 
He began his political career in 1969 when he became the parliamentary candidate for the National Alliance of Liberals (NAL) to represent Dzodze constituency prior to the commencement of the 1969 Ghanaian parliamentary election. He assumed office as a member of the first parliament of the second republic of Ghana on 1 October 1969 after being pronounced winner at the 1969 Ghanaian parliamentary election and was later suspended following the overthrow of the Busia government on 13 January 1972.

Personal life 
He is a Christian. He is a Company Director and Accountant.

See also 

 Busia government
 List of MPs elected in the 1969 Ghanaian parliamentary election

References 

Ghanaian MPs 1969–1972
1918 births
Alumni of Achimota School
Alumni of the University of London
People from Volta Region
Possibly living people